Comănescu is a Romanian-language surname. Notable people with the surname include:

 Lazăr Comănescu (born 1949), Romanian diplomat
 Nicolae Comănescu (born 1968), Romanian painter

See also
 Comănescu River
 Coman (disambiguation)

Romanian-language surnames